Tapio Piipponen (born 21 June 1957) is a Finnish biathlete. He competed at the 1984 Winter Olympics and the 1988 Winter Olympics.

References

External links
 

1957 births
Living people
Finnish male biathletes
Olympic biathletes of Finland
Biathletes at the 1984 Winter Olympics
Biathletes at the 1988 Winter Olympics
People from Sotkamo
Sportspeople from Kainuu